Sławomir Wieloch (born 17 January 1969) is a Polish former ice hockey player. He played for GKS Jastrzębie, Zagłębie Sosnowiec, Unia Oświęcim, Orlik Opole, and Cracovia during his career. He also played for the Polish national team at the 1992 Winter Olympics and multiple World Championships.

External links
 

1969 births
Living people
Ice hockey players at the 1992 Winter Olympics
JKH GKS Jastrzębie players
KH Zagłębie Sosnowiec players
MKS Cracovia (ice hockey) players
Olympic ice hockey players of Poland
Orlik Opole players
People from Czeladź
Polish ice hockey left wingers
TH Unia Oświęcim players
Sportspeople from Silesian Voivodeship